Sherrick Run is a  long 1st order tributary to Jacobs Creek in Westmoreland County, Pennsylvania.

Course
Sherrick Run rises in a pond about 1 mile northwest of Mount Pleasant, Pennsylvania, and then flows south to join Jacobs Creek at Iron Bridge.

Watershed
Sherrick Run drains  of area, receives about 42.3 in/year of precipitation, has a wetness index of 388.72, and is about 17% forested.

References

 
Tributaries of the Ohio River
Rivers of Pennsylvania
Rivers of Westmoreland County, Pennsylvania
Allegheny Plateau